Doron Shaziri (born 21 February 1967) is an Israeli Paralympic shooter.

Early life
In 1987, Shaziri was working as an Israel Defense Forces recruit while patrolling Israeli-Lebanon border where he tried to rescue his comrades but was hit by a mine. After the incident, he went to a military hospital where he was given a prosthetic leg. In 1994, he realized that he is a good engineer and even set up his own business where he was busy constructing wheelchairs for injured vets.

Career
In 2012, he was selected to be a flag bearer at the 2012 Paralympics opening ceremony; he also won a silver medal at these games. Prior to the London Paralympics, he also won silver and bronze medals in such competitions as the 1996 Atlanta, 2000 Sydney, 2004 Athens, and 2008 Beijing Paralympic Games.

References

External links
 
 
 

1967 births
Living people
Israeli male sport shooters
Paralympic shooters of Israel
Paralympic silver medalists for Israel
Paralympic bronze medalists for Israel
Paralympic medalists in shooting
Shooters at the 1996 Summer Paralympics
Shooters at the 2000 Summer Paralympics
Shooters at the 2004 Summer Paralympics
Shooters at the 2008 Summer Paralympics
Shooters at the 2012 Summer Paralympics
Shooters at the 2016 Summer Paralympics
Medalists at the 1996 Summer Paralympics
Medalists at the 2000 Summer Paralympics
Medalists at the 2004 Summer Paralympics
Medalists at the 2008 Summer Paralympics
Medalists at the 2012 Summer Paralympics
Medalists at the 2016 Summer Paralympics
Shooters at the 2020 Summer Paralympics